Tsvetkov is a surname. Notable people with the surname include:

Aleksandar Tsvetkov (born 1990), Bulgarian footballer, plays as a midfielder
Alexander Tsvetkov (1914–1990), a Bulgarian chess master
Alexei Tsvetkov (1924–2009), Russian sculptor (animal painter)
Alexei Tsvetkov (poet) (1947–2022), Russian poet and essayist
Alexei Tsvetkov (ice hockey) (born 1981), Russian professional ice hockey forward
Borislav Tsvetkov (born 1967), Bulgarian sprint canoeist who competed in the late 1980s
Dmitri Tsvetkov (1890–1930), Votic teacher and linguist
Dmitriy Tsvetkov (born 1983), Russian orienteering competitor and European champion
Ivan Tsvetkov (born 1979), Bulgarian footballer, plays as a forward
Mikhail Tsvetkov (born 1980), Russian high jumper
Milen Tsvetkov (born 1966), Bulgarian journalist and TV host
Nikolai Tsvetkov (born 1960), Russian oligarch, the founder and president of Nikoil Financial
Nikolay Tsvetkov (born 1986), Bulgarian footballer, plays as a midfielder
Pavel Tsvetkov (born 1971), Bulgarian poet and writer
Sergey Tsvetkov (born 1964), Russian historian
Valeri Tsvetkov (born 1977), retired Russian professional footballer

See also
Chavdar Tsvetkov Stadium, multi-use stadium in Svoge, Bulgaria
Dragan Tsvetkov Boulevard, large boulevard in Bulgaria's capital Sofia
Tsvety
Tsvitkove

Bulgarian-language surnames